Jim Whelan Boardwalk Hall, formerly known as the Historic Atlantic City Convention Hall, is a multi-purpose arena in Atlantic City in  Atlantic County, New Jersey. It was Atlantic City's primary convention center until the opening of the Atlantic City Convention Center in 1997. Boardwalk Hall was declared a U.S. National Historic Landmark in 1987 as one of the few surviving buildings from the city's early heyday as a seaside resort. The venue seats 10,500 people for ice hockey, and at maximum capacity can accommodate 14,770 for concerts. Boardwalk Hall is the home of the Miss America Pageant.

Boardwalk Hall contains the world's largest musical instrument, a pipe organ of over 33,000 pipes, eight chambers, its console the world's largest of seven manuals and over 1000 stop keys, and one of two  stops (the other found in the Sydney Town Hall). Also included in this organ are pipes operating on 100 inches of pressure, the Grand Ophicleide being the loudest and also most famous. The Guinness Book of World Records noted "a pure trumpet note of ear-splitting volume, six times louder than the loudest train whistle." However, these stops are actually well-refined and are not overpowering in Boardwalk Hall due to its huge interior.

In October 2017, the New Jersey Senate approved legislation to dedicate Atlantic City's Boardwalk Hall in honor of Senator Jim Whelan, the former mayor and state lawmaker who died earlier in the year.

History and Design
Edward L. Bader, mayor of Atlantic City from 1924 to 1927, led the initiative to acquire the land for Convention Hall, now Boardwalk Hall, and construction was underway at the time of his death.  The hall, designed by the architectural firm Lockwood Greene, was built in 1926.

The main hall measures 456 by 310 feet (139 by 94 m).  The barrel vault ceiling is 137 feet (42 m) high.  Ten pairs of three-hinged steel trusses support this unusually large clear span; there are no supporting columns.  Each pair of trusses spans 350 feet (110 m) and weighs 220 short tons (200 t).  The trusses are tied to the frame columns to allow the building to flex slightly with wind and ground pressure. The barrel ceiling consists of painted aluminum tiles.  It is decorated to resemble Roman bath tiles, and extends over 196,000 square feet (18,200 m2). The building's forward section is slightly rotated to align with the boardwalk, while the hall itself is aligned to the street grid.

It takes sound roughly 0.4 seconds to travel the length of the hall; because of this, the pipe organ chambers could not be built more than halfway back from the stage or a noticeable delay would occur. This led to two of the organ's chambers being placed in the upper shell of the building, in the space between the outer roof and the ceiling.

Various uses
 
The Miss America Pageant, founded in 1921 in Atlantic City, used Boardwalk Hall from the hall's opening in 1940 until 2006. The Pageant returned to the hall in 2013. It was last used for Miss America 2019.

It was also the venue for the August 1964 Democratic National Convention that nominated U.S. President Lyndon B. Johnson as the Democratic Party's candidate for the 1964 U.S. presidential election, nine months after the assassination of his predecessor, John F. Kennedy, in November 1963.

The following weekend, The Beatles held one of their largest concerts on their first U.S. tour at the hall.

Judy Garland gave a concert at Convention Hall on August 4, 1961. Garland returned for a second engagement on Sept 3rd, 1961.

The hall was also the venue for the concert by The Rolling Stones on their Steel Wheels Tour in 1989. The concert, which was shown on pay-per-view television, is widely remembered by fans for a mishap where viewers were cut off from the performance during the song "(I Can't Get No) Satisfaction", as well as the performance of "Miss You" in some countries. This concert was remastered, remixed and released on DVD, Blu-Ray, CD and Vinyl on 2 October 2020, as Steel Wheels Live Atlantic City, New Jersey '89.

On March 7, 2003, Bruce Springsteen and the E Street Band performed. Tickets for the event were immediately sold-out. Springsteen returned to perform a solo show on his Devils & Dust Tour on November 13, 2005.

On August 16, 2003 Justin Timberlake and Christina Aguilera were supposed to perform at the Boardwalk Hall, but due to a major stage collapse, the show (and later tour) was postponed.

On February 4, 2006, Bon Jovi from New Jersey performed for the Have a Nice Day Tour.

Phish played three nights at Boardwalk Hall for Halloween in both 2010 and 2013.  The 2010 Halloween concert featured a performance of Little Feat's Waiting For Columbus album in its entirety.  The 2013 show included the debut of Phish's unrecorded album Wingsuit, which would later become the album Fuego.

Jennifer Lopez performed a sold-out show in front of 11,220 people during her Dance Again World Tour on July 29, 2012

American pop star Madonna performed at the venue four times, with the first sold-out show at arena in front of 12,322 people during her Confessions Tour on July 16, 2006, she performed the second show in front of 13,293 people during her Sticky & Sweet Tour on November 22, 2008, and the third show  in front of 12,207 people during her MDNA Tour on September 15, 2012, The fourth and last time in front of 9,498 people during her Rebel Heart Tour on October 3, 2015.

Britney Spears performed a sold-out show in December 2001, and again for her Femme Fatale Tour on August 6, 2011.

Lady Gaga was scheduled to perform here on March 2, 2013 for her Born This Way Ball, but the show was later cancelled due to a hip injury which required surgery. She has previously performed at the arena on July 4, 2010 and February 19, 2011 as a part of her Monster Ball Tour. She performed a sold-out show on June 28, 2014 for her Artrave: The Artpop Ball Tour.

Beyoncé performed at the venue for the first time on The Mrs. Carter Show World Tour. The show sold out within its first few days of sales and took place on July 26, 2013.

Journey and Rascal Flatts made a stop at the hall for one-night shows, performing separately.

On May 22, 2015, The Who stopped at the Hall to celebrate their 50th anniversary on their tour, The Who Hits 50!

On June 8, 2019, Twenty One Pilots performed at the hall for their Bandito Tour.

Sporting events

Boxing
Mike Tyson fought in Boardwalk Hall several times as Heavyweight champion including four of his seven defenses as Undisputed Champion. Among his title defenses in Boardwalk Hall was a Fourth Round TKO over former champion Larry Holmes on January 22, 1988. His most famous bout at the venue was the 91-second Knockout of former champion and previously undefeated Michael Spinks on June 27, 1988.

On April 19, 1991, Undisputed Heavyweight Champion Evander Holyfield defeated former champion George Foreman in his first title defense.

Other fighters who have had boxing matches (many of which were title fights) in Boardwalk Hall include Sugar Ray Leonard, Oscar De La Hoya, Roberto Durán, Lennox Lewis, Roy Jones Jr., Floyd Mayweather Jr., Bernard Hopkins, Riddick Bowe, Julio César Chávez, Héctor Camacho, Micky Ward, and Arturo Gatti.

In September 2007, it was the venue for the Kelly Pavlik – Jermain Taylor boxing match for the World Boxing Council, World Boxing Organization and The Ring magazine's middleweight championships.

Soccer
On December 12, 1965, the New York Ukrainians defeated Philadelphia Ukrainian Nationals 3–2 in the first regulation indoor soccer match at the Convention Hall before more than 3,000 spectators.

College football
Prior to 1973, the NCAA was divided into two divisions, University and College. Boardwalk Hall hosted bowl games in both divisions; the University Division later became NCAA Division I, while the College Division became Division II and Division III.

The nation's first-ever indoor American football field was constructed within the hall in 1930, and hosted one to three games a year through the 1930s, before halting the practice due to World War II and not resuming games till 1961. The first of these was a 7–0 victory by Washington & Jefferson over Lafayette on October 25, 1930.

Liberty Bowl

In 1959, A. F. "Bud" Dudley, a former Villanova University athletic director, created the Liberty Bowl, an annual post-season college-football bowl game in Philadelphia, Pennsylvania. The game was played at Philadelphia Municipal Stadium, but as the only cold-weather bowl game, it was plagued by poor attendance. A group of Atlantic City businessmen convinced Dudley to move his game from Philadelphia to Boardwalk Hall for 1964 and guaranteed Dudley $25,000.

The 1964 Liberty Bowl was the first major (University Division) collegiate bowl game played indoors and was also the first indoor football game broadcast nationwide on U.S. television. Since artificial turf was still in its developmental stages and was unavailable for the game, the hall was equipped with a four-inch-thick grass surface with two inches of burlap underneath it (as padding) on top of concrete. To keep the grass growing, artificial lighting was installed and kept on 24 hours a day. The entire process cost about $16,000. End zones were only eight yards long instead of the usual ten yards.

6,059 fans saw the Utah Utes rout the West Virginia Mountaineers, 32–6. Dudley was paid $25,000 from Atlantic City businessmen, $60,000 from ticket sales, and $95,000 from television revenues, for a $10,000 net profit. This would be the only time the game was played in Atlantic City, as Dudley moved it the following year to Memphis, Tennessee, where it remains to this day.

Boardwalk Bowl

Boardwalk Hall was also the venue of the former Boardwalk Bowl post-season game from 1961 to 1973. From 1961 through 1967, the games were the "Little Army-Navy Game", featuring the College Division's Pennsylvania Military College and the Merchant Marine Academy. From 1968 through 1972, the bowl was the East regional final for the College Division; Delaware won four times, and Massachusetts won once. The final playing of the bowl was in 1973, as a Division II quarterfinal; Grambling defeated Delaware.

Indoor and Arena Football
In 2004, it was the home of the Atlantic City CardSharks, a professional indoor football team that played a single season in the National Indoor Football League. They finished the regular season in second place for their division with a 9–5 record and lost in the wild card round of the playoffs to the Lexington Horsemen 54–25.

On May 30, 2015, the venue hosted the Philadelphia Soul and Las Vegas Outlaws for the venue's first Arena Football League (AFL) game. The Soul won 51–43 with an attendance of 6,514.

In 2019, the AFL added the Atlantic City Blackjacks with home games at Boardwalk Hall. They finished their inaugural season 4–8 and the entire AFL ceased operations at the end of the season.

Basketball
The Syracuse Nationals and the Philadelphia Warriors played a regular season game at the arena on December 29, 1949.  The game was part of a double header.  The opening game was an exhibition basketball game between selected players of the Philadelphia Eagles and the Washington Redskins.

From 2007 through 2012, the Atlantic 10 Conference held its men's basketball championship at Boardwalk Hall.  The 2013 tournament was held at the Barclays Center in Brooklyn, New York.

The Brooklyn Nets and the Philadelphia 76ers played a preseason game at the arena on October 13, 2012.

In 2018, the Metro Atlantic Athletic Conference announced its men's and women's basketball tournaments will be held at Boardwalk Hall from 2020 through 2022.

Ice hockey
It played host to the Atlantic City Boardwalk Bullies, an ice-hockey team, from 2001 to 2005. From 2011 to 2013, ECAC Hockey held its men's ice hockey championship at Boardwalk Hall.

During the 2010–2011 season, Boardwalk Hall hosted four home games for the Albany Devils and one home game for the Trenton Devils both affiliated with the New Jersey Devils. The Albany Devils returned to play four home games during the 2012–13 and 2013–14 seasons.

Despite not having a team in Atlantic City, the American Hockey League hosted the 2012 All-Star Classic at Boardwalk Hall.

On November 24, 2012, Boardwalk Hall hosted "Operation Hat Trick", a charity hockey game to raise money for Hurricane Sandy victims. Among the NHL players who particated were Martin Brodeur, Andy Greene, Henrik Lundqvist, Bobby Ryan, and James van Riemsdyk.

Other sporting events

In 1995, the Hall was used for Monica Seles's return to tennis after she had been stabbed in 1993. It was a straight-sets victory over Martina Navratilova.

The Hall was used in 1996 for the women's tennis Fed Cup during which the U.S. beat Spain 5–0 in the Fed Cup women's tennis.

The Hall hosted the World Wrestling Federation's WrestleMania IV and V in 1988 and 1989, respectively, although on the television coverage it was referred to as "Trump Plaza" because the adjacent casino hotel was the primary sponsor. During the opening to WrestleMania IV, celebrity guest Bob Uecker does refer to the building as the 'convention center'. WrestleMania IV was attended by 18,165 fans while WrestleMania V had an attendance of 18,946. It is the only venue to host the annual pay-per-view event in consecutive years.

In addition to the two WrestleMania events, many other WWE shows have been held with both WWE Raw and WWE SmackDown taking place.

The PBR hosted a Built Ford Tough Series bull riding event at Boardwalk Hall during the 2003 and 2018 seasons.

The New Jersey State Interscholastic Athletic Association uses the hall to host the annual individual state wrestling tournament.

The Ultimate Fighting Championship has held four events in the hall, UFC 41: Onslaught in 2003, UFC 50: The War of '04 in 2004, UFC 53: Heavy Hitters in 2005, and most recently UFC Fight Night: Barboza vs. Lee in 2018.

The 2005 edition of the Skate America figure skating competition was held at Boardwalk Hall.

Midget car racing events have been held at the Boardwalk Hall since 1938. Since 2003 it hosts the Atlantic City Indoor Races, a round of the Indoor Auto Racing Championship Series.

The Hall hosted All Elite Wrestling on February 9, 2022 with an episode of AEW Dynamite. It also hosted the February 11, 2022 episode of AEW Rampage, which was taped on the same night as Dynamite.

2001 restoration 
A $90-million restoration designed by EwingCole was completed in 2001 and received several awards, including the 2003 National Preservation Award and Building magazine's 2002 Modernization Award. The organ in the hall, which is the world's biggest, has been severely damaged in the process.

Pipe organs

Constructed between May 1929 and December 1932, the Main Auditorium Organ is the "Poseidon" Midmer-Losh pipe organ, the world's-largest, as listed in The Guinness Book of World Records. The organ was badly damaged by the 1944 Great Atlantic Hurricane and has not been fully functional since. It was rendered completely inoperable by carelessness during hall renovation in 2001, and remained unplayable until 2007, when a restoration program began. As of 2022, about 60% of the organ's functionality has been restored.

Boardwalk Hall's attached ballroom contains a 55-rank Kimball concert/theater pipe organ — originally installed to accompany silent movies — that was severely damaged during the hall's renovation. Compared to the Main Auditorium organ, this organ looks tiny. The Ballroom organ is actually one of the largest theater organs by rank count, second to Radio City Music Hall's WurliTzer theater organ (58 ranks).

Restoration efforts have been underway, originally overseen by the Atlantic City Convention Hall Organ Society, now renamed Boardwalk Pipes, initially funded by private donations and federal Save America's Treasures grants. The organ restoration is overseen by the Historic Organ Restoration Committee, a 501(c)3 nonprofit chartered by the state of New Jersey for the restoration and preservation of the two pipe organs of Historic Boardwalk Hall. With additional foundation and private funding, the committee forecasts completion of restoration in 2023.

Awards
The convention center is one of the few buildings surviving from Atlantic City's heyday as a seaside resort in the 1920s.  It was an architectural and engineering triumph, its convention space providing the largest interior space with an unobstructed view at the time.  It was recognized for its engineering as a Historic Civil Engineering Landmark in 1983, and as a U.S. National Historic Landmark in 1987.

Billboard magazine recognized Boardwalk Hall as the top-grossing mid-sized arena in the U.S. in 2003 and 2004.
In 2003, The Ring magazine Fight of the Year was Gatti vs Ward which was hosted at the Hall.

See also

 Atlantic City Armory
 Atlantic City Convention Center
 National Register of Historic Places listings in Atlantic County, New Jersey

References

Further reading

External links and sources

 
 
 Image of Boardwalk Hall Auditorium Interior

 
1926 establishments in New Jersey
Atlantic City Blackjacks
Basketball venues in New Jersey
Boxing venues in Atlantic City, New Jersey
Event venues established in 1926
College basketball venues in the United States
Convention centers in New Jersey
Defunct NCAA bowl game venues
Event venues on the National Register of Historic Places in New Jersey
Historic American Buildings Survey in New Jersey
Historic Civil Engineering Landmarks
Indoor ice hockey venues in the United States
Mixed martial arts venues in New Jersey
Motorsport venues in New Jersey
National Historic Landmarks in New Jersey
National Register of Historic Places in Atlantic County, New Jersey
New Jersey Register of Historic Places
Romanesque Revival architecture in New Jersey
Sports venues in Atlantic City, New Jersey
Tourist attractions in Atlantic County, New Jersey
Philadelphia Fusion
Esports venues in New Jersey
Indoor arenas in Atlantic City, New Jersey